Komarovo may refer to:
Komarovo, Saint Petersburg, a municipal settlement under jurisdiction of Saint Petersburg, Russia
Komarovo, Novgorod Oblast, a former urban-type settlement in Novgorod Oblast; since 1998—a village (selo)
Komarovo, name of several rural localities in Russia